The Lost Army of Cambyses is a legendary Persian army of 50,000 men who supposedly disappeared in a sandstorm in the Western Desert in 524 BC.

Background
According to Herodotus 3.26, Cambyses II sent an army to threaten the Oracle of Amun at the Siwa Oasis. The army of 50,000 men was halfway across the desert when a massive sandstorm buried them all.

Although many Egyptologists regard the story as apocryphal, people have searched for the remains of the soldiers for years. They have included Count László Almásy (on whom the novel The English Patient is based) and modern geologist Tom Brown. In January 1933, Orde Wingate searched unsuccessfully in the Western Desert of Egypt, then known as the Libyan Desert.

Investigations in the 1980s
From September 1983 to February 1984, Gary S. Chafetz, an American journalist and author, led an expedition, sponsored by Harvard University, The National Geographic Society, the Egyptian Geological Survey and Mining Authority, and the Ligabue Research Institute. The six-month search was conducted along the Egyptian-Libyan border in a remote 100-square-kilometer area of complex dunes south west of the uninhabited Bahariya Oasis, approximately 100 miles south east of Siwa (Amon) Oasis. The $250,000 expedition had at its disposal 20 Egyptian geologists and labourers, a National Geographic photographer, two Harvard Film Studies documentary film-makers, three camels, an ultra-light aircraft, and ground-penetrating radar. The expedition discovered approximately 500 tumuli but no artifacts. Several tumuli contained bone fragments. Thermoluminescence later dated the fragments to 1500 BC, approximately 1,000 years earlier than the Lost Army. A recumbent winged sphinx carved in oolitic limestone was also discovered in a cave in the uninhabited Sitra Oasis (between Bahariya and Siwa Oases); its provenance appeared to be Persian. Chafetz was arrested when he returned to Cairo in February 1984 for "smuggling an airplane into Egypt" even though he had the written permission of the Egyptian Geological Survey and Mining Authority to bring the aircraft into the country. He was interrogated for 24 hours. The charges were dropped after he promised to "donate" the ultra-light to the Egyptian Government. The aircraft now sits in the Egyptian War Museum in Cairo with a caption that claimed it was from an Israeli spy.

Investigations after 2000
In the summer of 2000, a Helwan University geological team, prospecting for petroleum in Egypt's Western Desert, came across well-preserved fragments of textiles, bits of metal resembling weapons, and human remains that it believed to be traces of the Lost Army of Cambyses. The Egyptian Supreme Council of Antiquities announced that it would organize an expedition to investigate the site, but released no further information.

In November 2009, two Italian archaeologists, Angelo and Alfredo Castiglioni, announced the discovery of human remains, tools and weapons which date to the era of the Persian army. The artefacts were located near Siwa Oasis.
According to these two archaeologists this is the first archaeological evidence of the story reported by Herodotus. While working in the area, the researchers noticed a half-buried pot, some human remains, and what could have been a natural shelter. However, these "two Italian archaeologists" presented their discoveries in a documentary film rather than a scientific journal. Doubts have been raised because the Castiglioni brothers also happen to be the two film-makers who produced five controversial African shockumentaries in the 1970s (including Addio ultimo uomo, Africa ama, and Africa dolce e selvaggia) which audiences saw unedited footage of the severing of a penis, the skinning of a human corpse, the deflowering of a girl with a stone phallus, and a group of hunters tearing apart an elephant's carcass.
The Secretary General of the Egyptian Supreme Council of Antiquities, Zahi Hawass, has said in a press release that media reports of the discovery "are unfounded and misleading" and that "The Castiglioni brothers have not been granted permission by the SCA to excavate in Egypt, so anything they claim to find is not to be believed."

As a result of his excavations at the Dakhla Oasis, in 2015 Olaf E. Kaper of the University of Leiden argued that the Lost Army was not destroyed by a sandstorm, but rather ambushed and defeated by a rebel Egyptian pharaoh, Petubastis III. Petubastis was later defeated by Cambyses' successor Darius the Great, who purportedly invented the sandstorm story in order to remove Petubastis and his rebellion from Egyptian memory.

See also
List of people who disappeared

Notes

References 

524 BC
6th century BC in Egypt
Achaemenid Egypt
Cambyses II
Disasters in Egypt
Herodotus
Mass disappearances
Missing person cases in Egypt
Western Desert (Egypt)